Jack So Chak-kwong, GBM, GBS, OBE, JP is the chairman of the Board of Airport Authority Hong Kong from June 2015. He is a former chairman and Executive Director of the Hong Kong Trade Development Council (HKTDC), former chairman and Chief Executive of the MTR Corporation, and former Deputy chairman and Group managing director of PCCW.

In October 2013, he was appointed Chairman of the Consultative Committee on Economic and Trade Co-operation between Hong Kong and the Mainland. In January 2013 he was appointed a non-official member of the Economic Development Commission, and Convenor of its Working Group on Convention and Exhibition Industries and Tourism.

He was the Chairman of the Hong Kong Philharmonic Society, Chairman of Harrow International School Hong Kong, member of the Chinese People's Political Consultative Conference, Honorary Consultant to the Mayor of San Francisco, International Business Advisor to the Mayor of Beijing, and a member of Lantau Development Advisory Committee of Hong Kong Government.

He is an independent non-executive Director of AIA Group Ltd and China Resources Power Holdings Company Ltd., and senior advisor to Credit Suisse, Greater China. So is a former independent director of HSBC and Cathay Pacific Airways Limited.

A Justice of Peace, So were awarded the Gold Bauhinia Star in 2011 and the Grand Bauhinia Medal in 2017.

Early years
So was born in Guangzhou, China on 1945. He went to La Salle College and the University of Hong Kong and obtained a diploma in economics from Cambridge University, UK.

Career
So began his career with the Hong Kong Government. He then joined the private sector in 1978 and held various senior positions in stockbroking, banking and property development.

He served as Executive Director of the Hong Kong Trade Development Council (TDC) from 1985 to 1992, and the chairman from 2007 to 2015.

So was the chairman and Chief Executive of the Mass Transit Railway Corporation Limited from 1995 to 2003.  He was Deputy chairman and Group managing director of PCCW from 2003 to 2007.

He is a non-executive Director of American International Assurance Group Limited and China Resources Power Holding Company Ltd., and senior advisor to Credit Suisse, Greater China. So was an independent director of The Hongkong and Shanghai Banking Corporation Limited from 2000 to 2007 and Cathay Pacific Airways Limited from 2002 to 2015.

In the political aspect, So is a member of the Chinese People's Political Consultative Conference from 2008 to 2018. He was an International Business Advisor to the Mayor of Beijing, and was appointed Honorary Consultant to the Mayor of San Francisco in 2013. He was also appointed by the HKSAR Government as Chairman of the Film Development Council from April 2007 to March 2013.

So is an Honorary Doctorate in Social Sciences at The University of Hong Kong (HKU). He was appointed Member of The University Council in 2000 and served as the Chairman of The University’s Campus Development & Planning Committee from 2006 to 2012, and was responsible for the building of HKU’s new Centennial Campus.

Awards and honours 
 Honorable Decorations in Social Science from University of Hong Kong (2011)
 Gold Bauhinia Star (Hong Kong/2011)
 Grand Bauhinia Medal (Hong Kong/2017)

Controversies

Panama Papers 
So's name is found among the Panama Papers, including as an owner of an offshore company Jaderich Limited and as a stock holder of Solid Foundation Limited (SFL). He refused to reveal the business nature of Jarderich  Ltd, when he was enquired by the local media. He only stated the company has been inactive for year.

References

External links 

 HKTDC farewells Jack So Chak-kwong, on YouTube

 

1945 births
Living people
Hong Kong chief executives
Government officials of Hong Kong
MTR Corporation
Alumni of the University of Hong Kong
Businesspeople from Guangzhou
Members of the National Committee of the Chinese People's Political Consultative Conference
District councillors of Wan Chai District
Members of the Selection Committee of Hong Kong
Members of the Election Committee of Hong Kong, 1998–2000
Members of the Election Committee of Hong Kong, 2000–2005
Members of the Election Committee of Hong Kong, 2007–2012
Members of the Election Committee of Hong Kong, 2012–2017
Members of the Election Committee of Hong Kong, 2021–2026
Recipients of the Grand Bauhinia Medal
Recipients of the Gold Bauhinia Star
Officers of the Order of the British Empire